Karl Gotthelf Lehmann (7 March 1812 in Leipzig – 6 January 1863 in Jena) was a German physiological chemist.

From 1830 he studied medicine at the University of Leipzig, receiving his doctorate in 1835 with a thesis titled De urina diabetica. In 1842 he became an associate professor of medicine at Leipzig, where in 1854 he was named a full professor of physiological chemistry. From 1856 to 1863 he was a professor of general chemistry at the University of Jena.

Published works 
His 3-volume Lehrbuch der physiologischen Chemie was translated into English by George Edward Day and published with the title, Physiological chemistry (Vol. 1; Vol. 2; Vol. 3, 1851–54). Other noted works by Lehmann include:
 Vollständiges Taschenbuch der theoretischen Chemie, 1840 – Complete handbook of theoretical chemistry.
 Einige vergleichende Analysen des Blutes der Pfortader und der Lebernerven, 1850 – Comparative analyses of the blood of the portal vein and the hepatic nerves.
 Handbuch der physiologischen Chemie, 1853 – Handbook of physiological chemistry.
 Zoochemie (edited with Karl Hugo Huppert, 1858) – Zoochemistry.
A number of his works relating to medicine and physiological chemistry were published in Otto Linné Erdmann's Journal für praktische Chemie.

References 

1812 births
1863 deaths
Leipzig University alumni
Academic staff of Leipzig University
Academic staff of the University of Jena
Physicians from Leipzig
German biochemists